Olaf Karthaus (born 1963 in Koblenz) is a German polymer chemist and Professor at the Chitose Institute of Science and Technology in Chitose, Hokkaidō, Japan, researching polymer chemistry, thin films, photonics, and nanotechnology.

Karthaus received a PhD from Johannes Gutenberg University of Mainz in Mainz, Germany, in 1992 under the supervision of Helmut Ringsdorf.  From 1992 to 1993 he worked as a post-doctoral fellow of the Japan Society for the Promotion of Science (JSPS) and the Alexander von Humboldt Foundation at Tohoku University.  He then served as a research assistant from 1994 to 2000 at the Research Institute for Electronic Science at Hokkaido University in Sapporo.

Karthaus was a co-plaintiff with Debito Arudou and Kenneth Sutherland in an anti-discrimination lawsuit against a hot spring (onsen) in Otaru, Japan, that refused entry to individuals with foreign appearance even if they were Japanese citizens.

Selected publications
He has authored or coauthored 54 peer-reviewed articles in scientific journals: according to Science Citation Index, the ones that have been the most cited are:
 (cited 116 times)
 (cited 72 times)
 (cited 67 times)
 (cited 65 times)
 (cited 44 times)

References

External links
 Karthaus Laboratory homepage
 

1963 births
Living people
Johannes Gutenberg University Mainz alumni
Scientists from Koblenz
20th-century German chemists
21st-century German chemists